Diocesan Schools Group of Pagadian (also referred as the Diocesan Schools of Pagadian) is the network of sixteen schools under the administration and control of the Roman Catholic Diocese of Pagadian. The schools are governed by the Bishop of Pagadian, Most Rev. Emmanuel T. Cabajar, C.Ss.R, through the Diocesan Schools Superintendent, Rev. Foelan G. Echavez, M.A.

Prior to the takeover in the 1970s under Bishop Jesus B. Tuquib , Holy Child Academy, Star of the Sea High School, Immaculate Heart Academy, and Saint Columban College were run by the Missionary Society of St. Columban.

Tertiary

Saint Columban College 

Columban is the largest among the diocesan schools. Operating in three campuses in Pagadian City, the College offers elementary, secondary, and tertiary education.

Sta. Maria Goretti College 
Sta. Maria Goretti has not developed its own undergraduate programs. It offered undergraduate programs while serving as a satellite campus for Saint Columban College. However, due to the preference of students to attend college in cities like Ozamis and Pagadian, it ceased offering the same programs.

Major Secondary Institutions

Holy Child Academy 

Holy Child Academy or "HCA", is the oldest diocesan school. Established in 1940, HCA is also the second oldest school in Pagadian City and the Province of Zamboanga del Sur following the Southern Mindanao Colleges. HCA began as a parochial school, pioneering Catholic education in the Province.

Star of the Sea High School 

Star of the Sea is the only private academic institution in the Municipality of Tukuran in Zamboanga del Sur.

Immaculate Heart Academy 

Other Institutions
The following are the other academic institutions in the Province of Zamboanga del Sur under the control of the Roman Catholic Diocese of Pagadian.

See also
 Roman Catholic Diocese of Pagadian
 Missionary Society of St. Columban
 Zamboanga del Sur

References

External links
 Roman Catholic Diocese of Pagadian
 Catholic Educational Association of the Philippines
 St. Columban College
 Roman Catholic Diocese of Pagadian (Educational Centers)

Catholic elementary schools in the Philippines
Schools in Pagadian